The Royal Danish Air Force Academy educates and commissions all officers for the Royal Danish Air Force. The Air Force Officer Academy function was initiated in 1951 by the creation of the Royal Danish Air Force.

Location
The Air Force officers school is located in Jonstrup near Værløse.

Other Danish Academies
 Army: The Royal Danish Military Academy (Hærens Officersskole) located at Frederiksberg Palace in Copenhagen.
 Navy: The Royal Danish Naval Academy (Søværnets Officersskole) located at Holmen Naval Base in Copenhagen.
 Emergency Management Agency: The Emergency Management Officers School (Beredskabsstyrelsens Center for Lederuddannelse) located at Bernstorff Palace in Gentofte

Air force
Air force
Danish
Forsvaret
Educational institutions established in 1951
Air Force Officers School
1951 establishments in Denmark